was a Japanese politician. He was governor of Saga Prefecture (1898–1901), Gunma Prefecture (1901–1902) and Nagano Prefecture (1902–1905).

Awards
1907 – Order of the Rising Sun

References

1851 births
1927 deaths
Governors of Saga Prefecture
Governors of Gunma Prefecture
Governors of Nagano
Recipients of the Order of the Rising Sun